Softball was contested by participating nations at the 1995 Pan American Games in Mar del Plata, Argentina.

Medal summary

Medal table

Medalists

 
Softball at the Pan American Games
Events at the 1995 Pan American Games
1995 in softball
Softball in Argentina